Membrane fusion proteins (not to be confused with chimeric or fusion proteins) are proteins that cause fusion of biological membranes. Membrane fusion is critical for many biological processes, especially in eukaryotic development and viral entry. Fusion proteins can originate from genes encoded by infectious enveloped viruses, ancient retroviruses integrated into the host genome, or solely by the host genome. Post-transcriptional modifications made to the fusion proteins by the host, namely addition and modification of glycans and acetyl groups, can drastically affect fusogenicity (the ability to fuse).

Fusion in eukaryotes 
Eukaryotic genomes contain several gene families, of host and viral origin, which encode products involved in driving membrane fusion. While adult somatic cells do not typically undergo membrane fusion under normal conditions, gametes and embryonic cells follow developmental pathways to non-spontaneously drive membrane fusion, such as in placental formation, syncytiotrophoblast formation, and neurodevelopment. Fusion pathways are also involved in the development of musculoskeletal and nervous system tissues. Vesicle fusion events involved in neurotransmitter trafficking also relies on the catalytic activity of fusion proteins.

SNARE family 
The SNARE family include bona fide eukaryotic fusion proteins. They are only found in eukaryotes and their closest archaeal relatives like Heimdallarchaeota.

VAMP

Retroviral 
These proteins originate from the env gene of endogenous retroviruses. They are domesticated viral class I fusion proteins.

 Syncytins are responsible for structures of the placenta. 
 Syncytin-1
 Syncytin-2
ERV3 is not functional in humans

HAP2 family 
HAP2 is a domesticated viral class II fusion protein found in diverse eukaryotes including Toxoplasma, vascular plants, and fruit flies. This protein is essential for gamete fusion in these organisms.

Pathogenic viral fusion 
Enveloped viruses readily overcome the thermodynamic barrier of merging two plasma membranes by storing kinetic energy in fusion (F) proteins. F proteins can be independently expressed on host cell surfaces which can either (1) drive the infected cell to fuse with neighboring cells, forming a syncytium, or (2) be incorporated into a budding virion from the infected cell which leads to the full emancipation of plasma membrane from the host cell. Some F components solely drive fusion while a subset of F proteins can interact with host factors. There are four groups of fusion proteins categorized by their structure and mechanism of fusion.

Class I 
Class I fusion proteins resemble influenzavirus hemagglutinin in their structure. Post-fusion, the active site has a trimer of α-helical coiled-coils. The binding domain is rich in α-helices and hydrophobic fusion peptides located near the N-terminus. Fusion conformation change can often be controlled by pH.

Class II 
Class II proteins are dominant in β-sheets and the catalytic sites are localized in the core region. The peptide regions required to drive fusion are formed from the turns between the β-sheets.

Class III 
Class III fusion proteins are distinct from I and II. They typically consist of 5 structural domains, where domain 1 and 2 localized to the C-terminal end often contain more β-sheets and domains 2-5 closer to the N-terminal side are richer in α-helices. In the pre-fusion state, the later domains nest and protect domain 1 (i.e. domain 1 is protected by domain 2, which is nested in domain 3, which is protected by domain 4). Domain 1 contains the catalytic site for membrane fusion.

Class IV 
Class IV fusion proteins, better known as fusion-associated small transmembrane proteins (FAST), are the smallest type of fusion protein. They are found in reoviruses, which are non-enveloped viruses and are specialized for cell-cell rather than virus-cell fusion, forming syncytia. They are the only known membrane fusion proteins found in non-enveloped viruses.

Examples

See also 
 Interbilayer forces in membrane fusion
 Viral membrane fusion proteins

References

External links 
 

Membrane proteins